Radio Classic FM is a Bulgarian radio station, launched in 1994. It is the oldest radio of BTV Media Group, owned by Central European Media Enterprises (WarnerMedia/AT&T) (75%). The station airs mainly classic music. Originally launched in Munich on the frequencies of Radio Free Europe, later moved to Sofia. It is the main organiser of the European Music Festival in Bulgaria. In 2006, it was bought by bTV and from 2008 it has aired the bTV morning program.

References 

Radio stations in Bulgaria
Mass media in Sofia

Radio stations established in 1994